Ticonectria is a fungal genus in the order Hypocreales. The relationship of this taxon to other taxa within the order is unknown (incertae sedis), and it has not yet been placed with certainty into any family.

References

External links

Hypocreales incertae sedis
Sordariomycetes genera